Felt: A Tribute to Christina Ricci is the first studio album by Felt, an American hip hop duo made up of Murs and Slug. It is a concept album about actress Christina Ricci. Produced by The Grouch, it was released by Rhymesayers Entertainment in 2002. It has sold over 50,000 copies.

Track listing

Personnel
Credits adapted from liner notes.

 Murs – vocals
 Slug – vocals
 The Grouch – production
 Mr. Dibbs – turntables
 Manproof – artwork
 Dan Monick – photography

References

External links
 

2002 albums
Murs (rapper) albums
Tribute albums to non-musicians
Rhymesayers Entertainment albums